The River City Stakes is a Grade III American thoroughbred horse race for horses age three and older over a distance of one and one eighth miles on the turf held annually in November at Churchill Downs in Louisville, Kentucky. The event offers a purse of $100,000.

History
The name of the event is after a nickname for the city of Louisville where river traffic between the upper Ohio River and the Gulf of Mexico provided the early settlement of Louisville as it grew as a portage site. 

The event was inaugurated on 30 October 1978, opening day of Churchill Downs Fall meeting as the River City Handicap as a six furlong dirt race and was won by Inca Roca who won his fifth race from fourteen starts in a time of 1:10.

The event was run over six furlongs until 1981 and then increased to 1 mile. In 1987 the event was scheduled on the turf over a distance of  miles. The following year the distance of the event increased to  miles but it was moved off the turf and onto the main track due to inclement weather.

The American Graded Stakes Committee classified the event as Grade III in 1996 and was won by the 2/1 favourite Same Old Wish. Same Old Wish would win the event again the following year as a seven-year-old.

The event was run as a handicap prior to 2019.

The race was not run from 2020 to 2021.

Records
Speed record:
 miles:  1:47.90  – Dr. Kashnikow (CAN)   (2001)
1 mile (dirt): 1:36.20 -  	Taylor's Special (1986)

Margins:
7 lengths – Go With the Times (1979)

Most wins:
 2 – Same Old Wish (1996, 1997)
 2 – Dr. Kashnikow (CAN) (2001, 2002)
 2 – Mr. Misunderstood (2018, 2019)

Most wins by an owner:
 2 – Friendship Stable (1996, 1997)
 2 – Erdenheim Farm (2001, 2002)
 2 – Flurry Racing Stables (2018, 2019)

Most wins by a jockey:
 6 – Pat Day (1982, 1984, 1986, 1991, 1999, 2000)

Most wins by a trainer:
 2 – Joseph M. Bollero  (1979, 1982)
 2 – William C. Thomas (1980, 1988)
 2 – William I. Mott (1986, 1987)
 2 – W. Elliott Walden (1994, 2000)
 2 – Robert Barbara (1996, 1997)
 2 – Neil J. Howard (1999, 2005)
 2 – John R. S. Fisher (2001, 2002)
 2 – Brad H. Cox (2018, 2019)

Winners

Legend:

See also
 List of American and Canadian Graded races

External site
 Churchill Downs Media Guide - $175,000 River City (Grade III)

References

Graded stakes races in the United States
Grade 3 stakes races in the United States
Turf races in the United States
Churchill Downs horse races
Recurring sporting events established in 1978
1978 establishments in Kentucky
Horse races in Kentucky